Kelvin Barry "Kel" Richards (born 8 February 1946) is an Australian author, journalist, radio personality and lay Christian.

Richards has written a series of crime novels and thrillers for adult readers which includes The Case of the Vanishing Corpse, Death in Egypt and An Outbreak of Darkness.

Richards presented ABC NewsRadio's weekend afternoons, which included regular Wordwatch segments until 15 August 2010. Wordwatch was a feature introduced by Richards. Initially developed as a "filler" program for the radio programs to allow time for changes of people or locations, it tapped into an interest by the listening public and several books have been produced based on the show's research. In November 2003 the thousandth episode of the show was produced.

Kel Richards currently presents Sydney radio station 2CH's Sunday night program "Sunday Night with Kel Richards".

He is a lay canon at St Andrew's Cathedral, Sydney, and the author of the Aussie Bible, which has sold over 100,000 copies. This book translates sections of the Bible into Australian vernacular ('strine').

Bibliography

Crime novels
Ben Bartholomew series
 The Case of the Vanishing Corpse (Hodder & Stoughton, 1990)
 The Case of the Secret Assassin (Hodder & Stoughton, 1992)
 The Case of the Damascus Dagger (Hodder & Stoughton, 1994)
 The Case of the Dead Certainty (Hodder & Stoughton, 1995)

Mark Roman mysteries
 The Second Death (Coronet Books, 1993)
 The Third Bloodstain (Hodder & Stoughton, 1995)

Sherlock Holmes: Tales of Terror
 Curse of the Pharaohs (Beacon Communications, c. 1997)
 The Headless Monk (Beacon Communications, c. 1997)
 The Vampire Serpent (Beacon, 1997)

C.S. Lewis mysteries
 C.S. Lewis and the Body in the Basement ( Strand Publishing, 2013)
 C.S. Lewis and the Country House Murders (2014)
 The Floating Corpse (Strand Publishing, 2015) 
 The Sinister Student : A 1930s Murder Mystery (Marylebone House, 2016)

Other works
 Moonlight Shadows (Hodder & Stoughton, 1994)
 Death in Egypt : a Murder Mystery (Hodder & Stoughton, 1996)

Short stories
 "The Amateur Hangman", More Crimes for a Summer Christmas edited by Stephen Knight (1991)

Adaptations
 The Ballad of the Two Sons (Anzea Publishers, c 1993) illustrated by Meng
 Aussie Yarns  (c. 2004)
 Aussie Pilgrim's Progress : John Bunyan's immortal story (2006)
 An Aussie Christmas Carol : Charles Dickens' immortal tale retold as an Aussie bush yarn (2007)

Children's picture book
"The Lamington Man" (1997) with Glen Singleton

Non-fiction
 ABC Classic FM's Word of the Day (2004) with Clive Robertson
 The Story of Australian English
 Word Map: What words are Used Where in Australia (ABC Books, 2005) with the Macquarie Dictionary
 Word of the day 2: Wordwatching: a Wonderful Look Into the World of Words (ABC Books, 2006)

Television writing
 Murder Call TV episodes
 – Deadfall (1998)
 – A Blow to the Heart (1999)
 – House of Spirits (2000)
 – A Stab in the Dark (2000)

Notes

References
Austlit – Richards, Kel

External links 
 Kel Richards Books

Australian crime writers
Australian mystery writers
Australian children's writers
Australian male short story writers
Australian lexicographers
Living people
1946 births
ABC radio (Australia) journalists and presenters